Ust-Talovka is a rural locality (a selo) and the administrative center of Ust-Talovsky Selsoviet, Kuryinsky District, Altai Krai, Russia. The population was 948 as of 2013. There are 8 streets.

Geography 
Ust-Talovka is located 19 km south of Kurya (the district's administrative centre) by road. Kurya and Ruchyovo are the nearest rural localities.

References 

Rural localities in Kuryinsky District